Sandfields West is an electoral ward and a community of Neath Port Talbot county borough, Wales.    It is part of the parliamentary constituency of Aberavon. The ward elects three county councillors to Neath Port Talbot County Borough Council.

Description
The community boundaries are coterminous with the electoral ward. Sandfields West is bounded by the wards of Baglan to the northwest, Aberavon to the northeast, and Sandfields East to the southeast.

Sandfields West is a mostly urbanised ward consisting of council housing inland, private housing on the coast and areas of light industry and business park use.

At the 2011 UK Census the population of the ward was 6,725 (with 5,214 of voting age).

County council elections
In the 2012 local council elections, the electorate turnout was 35.47%.  The councillors who were elected were:

In February 2017, Councillor James Evans and Councillor Andre Chavis left the Labour party.  They sat as Independent councillors.

In the 2017 local council elections, the councillors who were elected were:

References

Electoral wards of Neath Port Talbot
Communities in Neath Port Talbot

cy:Traethmelyn